On 10 August 2002, the government of Turkmenistan adopted a law to rename all the months and most of the days of the week. The names were chosen according to Turkmen national symbols, as described in the Ruhnama, a book written by Saparmyrat Nyýazow, Turkmenistan's first and only president for life. According to Arto Halonen's documentary film The Shadow of the Holy Book, Turkish businessman Ahmet Çalık came up with the idea to rename the months, as he was trying to befriend Nyýazow to expand his business in the country.

After the law was passed the new names were used in all Turkmen state-owned media. Publications in languages other than Turkmen often use the new names too, especially those that were targeted at Russian-speaking citizens of Turkmenistan, with the old name sometimes written in brackets. The old month names were still used in popular speech, however.

Four years after the change, Nyýazow died in 2006. On 23 April 2008 it was reported that the cabinet of ministers of Turkmenistan discussed restoring the old names of the months and days of week. The old names were finally restored in July 2008.

The original Roman calendar month names were borrowed from Russian. The adopted Turkmen month names were as follows:

The original names of the days of the week come from Persian. The adopted names were as follows:

See also
Gregorian calendar

References

External links
 The months of the Gregorian (Christian) calendar in various languages
 The days of the week in various languages
 Бердымухамедов велел вернуть старый календарь, Аркадий Дубнов, gundogar.org, 2008-04-25 

Turkmenistan culture
Languages of Turkmenistan
Specific calendars
Saparmyrat Nyýazow
Names of units of time
Renaming of Turkmen months and days of week
Months
Days of the week